Kitchen is an unincorporated community in Logan County, West Virginia, United States. Their post office has been closed.

References 

Unincorporated communities in West Virginia
Unincorporated communities in Logan County, West Virginia
Coal towns in West Virginia
Populated places on the Guyandotte River